Tracy (1990 – 1997) was a transgenically modified sheep created by scientists at Scotland's Roslin Institute to produce the human protein alpha 1-antitrypsin, a substance regarded in the 1990s as a potential pharmaceutical for the treatments  of cystic fibrosis and emphysema. Notably, she is the first transgenic farm mammal ever created.

Alpha 1-antitrypsin comprised 50% of the total protein in Tracy's milk, a remarkably high level maintained after lactation. Similar levels were detected in the milk produced by her granddaughters. A deficiency in this protein in humans can produce lung diseases, and its artificial creation was thought to be a potential success in the diseases' treatment. Clinical trials for the engineered protein in 1998 revealed that it developed breathing problems in patients, and research for the milk as a remedy for the diseases has not continued since then.

See also
Dolly (sheep)
Pharming (genetics)
Genetically modified organisms

References

Cloned sheep
1990 animal births
1997 animal deaths
Individual animals in the United Kingdom